Haltermann Carless is the present-day continuation of one of the earliest oil companies.

History
 1859: Carless was formed by Eugene Carless.  Its base was the Hope Chemical Works in Hackney Wick. 
 1860: Carless became Carless, Blagdon and Company, when William George Blagdon joined in partnership.
 1870: Carless, Blagdon and Company was dissolved by Blagdon.  George Bligh Capel became a partner in the firm.  Carless started selling a volatile inflammable petroleum distillate tradenamed 'Petrol'. That is where the word "petrol" came from. At first it was often used as a solvent, including to remove nits by dissolving the natural glue that the female louse uses to stick the nit to the hair. When internal combustion engines were invented, petrol was found to be suitable fuel for them.
 1872: Carless, Capel and Leonard formed.  John Hare Leonard joined Capel as a partner.  Carless was no longer a partner but was retained by the new company as the manager of its works. 
 1893:  Frederick Simms, on behalf of Gottlieb Daimler, visited Carless, Capel, and Leonard to form and agreement to use the Launch Spirit for Daimler Launches.  It was a result of this meeting that the company began to use the word Petrol to distinguish is product from other motor spirit products.  The word 'petrol' is still the generic name for gasoline used throughout the UK.
 1996: Petrochem Distribution BVBA was established.
 2000: Petrochem UK acquired Carless from the Spanish Repsol-YPF Group.  The resulting company is now called Petrochem Carless Ltd.
 2013: The company was acquired by HCS Group and rebranded Haltermann Carless.

Operations
Halterman Carless has operations in Leatherhead, Harwich and Stanlow in the UK, and Hamburg and Speyer in Germany.

References

External links
https://web.archive.org/web/20151121234547/http://haltermann-carless.com/en/about-us/history
Pioneers of Petrol - A Centenary History of Carless, Capel and Leonard 1859-1959 - Edward Liveing - 1959
Carless, Capel and Leonard plc - The Growth of a Family Firm into an International Oil Company - Peter Pugh - 1986

Oil and gas companies of the United Kingdom